Merrily Stratten (born 12 June 1951) is a Canadian former swimmer. She competed in the women's 200 metre freestyle at the 1972 Summer Olympics.

References

External links
 

1951 births
Living people
Canadian female swimmers
Olympic swimmers of Canada
Swimmers at the 1972 Summer Olympics
Swimmers from Toronto
20th-century Canadian women
21st-century Canadian women